United States v. Navajo Nation,  537 U.S. 488 (2003) was a United States Supreme Court case in which the Navajo Nation initiated proceedings alleging that the Secretary of the Interior had breached their fiduciary duty to the Tribe by not acting in the Tribe's best interests.

Conclusion 

Citing Mitchell II the court found that "The IMLA and its implementing regulations impose no obligations resembling the detailed fiduciary responsibilities that Mitchell II found adequate to support a claim for money damages", reversing the judgment of the United States Court of Appeals and remanding the case.

See also 
 United States v. Navajo Nation (2009)
 List of United States Supreme Court cases

References 

United States Native American case law
United States Supreme Court cases
United States Supreme Court cases of the Rehnquist Court
2003 in United States case law
Navajo Nation